Krišjānis Barons (October 31, 1835 – March 8, 1923) was a Latvian writer who is known as the "father of the dainas" thanks largely to his systematization of the Latvian folk songs and his labour in preparing their texts for publication in Latvju dainas. His portrait appeared on the 100-lat banknote prior to the Lat being replaced by the Euro in 2014, his being the only human face of an actual person on modern Latvian currency. Barons was very prominent among the Young Latvians, and also an important writer and editor.

Latvju dainas

Background and importance

Barons is well known as the creator of Latvju dainas (LD), published between 1894 and 1915 in six volumes, and including 217 996 folk songs. But Barons was not the author of the original idea, neither did he collect the texts, nor rewrite all of the received texts on the tiny paper slips of the famous Cabinet of Folksongs (Dainu skapis), though there is a significant number of the slips displaying Barons' own handwriting, as some may believe. Still, his contribution is of no less importance. He elaborated the classification system of LD, arranging the texts and introducing the notion of song type or bush (choosing a text as the main one among a number of similar ones, and grouping the rest around it – this allows for easier perception of variation and saves space in the published edition, as only the differences are indicated in print). Barons had also edited some texts, in order to restore their possible older and better form. In recognition of the Barons' labors and the historical value of the Cabinet of Folksongs, the work was inscribed on UNESCO's Memory of the World Register in 2001.

Already at the time when Barons was working on the edition, the traditional singing had been lost to a great extent; Barons in his introduction to LD mentions that "the sources of nation's memory, as it seemed, filled up and having run dry long ago, started to flow amazingly." He also warns that "the old ladies, our purest source of folk songs, become rarer and rarer with each day". Barons also points at the Latvians themselves turning away from the singing of traditional songs when accepting Christianity for example.

Publication
On the title page of LD, Krišjānis Barons is not the only publisher indicated. Besides his name there is also that of Henrijs Visendorfs (1861–1916). Barons, in the same introduction to LD, wrote: "Then in the month of January 1892 I was surprised by a kind letter from St. Petersburg, from Mr. Wissendorff, in which he offered his support for the publication of the edition. We soon achieved our agreement on this." Visendorfs was a well-to-do Latvian merchant, with his own office at the famous St. Petersburg Gostinnij Dvor. He had gotten interested in Latvian culture before, supporting researchers and editions, and writing about Latvian mythology himself (although these writings were not met with enthusiasm by the academic scholars). Visendorfs later provided Barons with copies of collections from the Jelgava Latvian Society Department of Literature.

By the publication of Volume 1 of LD, he had submitted to Barons 12,800 song texts, acquired "with the help of local collectors"; altogether his collection contains 28 406 texts. It is likely that based on the popular idea of that time, that of the Latvian-Lithuanian great nation, he suggested to Barons the word "daina", which is actually Lithuanian, and which became the title of the edition. The first volume was published in Jelgava, funded by Visendorfs himself. But it turned out to be rather costly, and Visendorfs, using his connections, organised the publication of the other volumes with the help of the Imperial Academy of Sciences. In 1900 it was officially settled and from 1903 till 1915 the other volumes were published. These volumes, in addition to the previous two title pages in different languages (Latvian and French), received one more in Russian. Although Visendorfs took no part in editing and arranging the texts, his contribution performing organisational tasks, reading the preprints of the volumes published in St. Petersburg and providing his advice was significant enough to earn a place for his name on the title page, although Prof. Pēteris Šmits objected to it.

In 1893 Krisjanis Barons returned to Latvia with his Cabinet of Folksongs, at that time containing around 150,000 texts. The index to LD shows more than 900 contributors, among them 237 male informants, 137 female informants, while of collectors only 54 are laies, at least 150 were school teachers, 50 were men of letters and 20 were priests. Barons, without exact account, indicates the total number of texts used to be 217 996; this number is usually quoted as that of the songs published. Still, as LD was created based on collection by local people, it doesn't cover comprehensively the whole territory of Latvia. 218 Latvian civil parishes were not represented, not even with a single text. To collect from the mute parishes, 30 years after the publication of LD was started, Latviesu folkloras krātuve began its activities.

Whatever the other editions there are and will be in the future, LD has become the most quoted and referred to, as testified by two repeated editions – in 1922–1923 and 1989–1994.

Legacy

Barons efforts to collect folklore and dainas were vital for the emergence of Dievturība, a Baltic neopagan movement established by Ernests Brastiņš and Kārlis Marovskis-Bregžis in the 1920s.

A minor planet 3233 Krišbarons, discovered by Soviet astronomer Nikolai Stepanovich Chernykh in 1977 is named after him. One of the main streets in Riga, Krišjāna Barona iela, is named after him.

His descendants are currently residing in the United States, primarily located in a small town in western Pennsylvania called Grove City.

References

Sources
 Latvju Dainas

External links

1835 births
1923 deaths
People from Tukums Municipality
People from Courland Governorate
Latvian male writers
19th-century writers from the Russian Empire
19th-century Latvian historians
University of Tartu alumni
Latvian folk music
Latvian folklorists
Linguists from Latvia
19th-century linguists
19th-century male writers
20th-century Latvian historians
20th-century linguists
20th-century male writers
Latvian antiquarians